Ma Chen-shan (born 21 May 1926) is a Taiwanese former sports shooter. He competed in the 25 metre pistol event at the 1964 Summer Olympics.

References

External links
 

1926 births
Possibly living people
Taiwanese male sport shooters
Olympic shooters of Taiwan
Shooters at the 1964 Summer Olympics
Place of birth missing (living people)